Bones is a surname. Notable people with the surname include:
 Alan Bones, Canadian diplomat
 Bad Bones, German wrestler
 Bice Bones (born 1969), Italian ski mountaineer
 Bobby Bones (musician), American musician and actor
 Bobby Bones or Bobby Estell, host of the Bobby Bones Show
 Brother Bones (1902–1974), American whistling and bone-playing recording artist
 Ebony Bones, British singer-songwriter, record producer and actress
 Frankie Bones (born 1966), American techno and house music disc jockey
 Helen Woodrow Bones (1874-1951), American secretary and book editor
 Ken Bones (born c. 1950), British actor
 Marietta Bones (1842–1901), American suffragist, social reformer, philanthropist
 Mickey Bones, American drummer and singer-songwriter
 Mike Bones or Mike Strallow, guitarist singer-songwriter
 Ricky Bones (born 1969), former Major League Baseball pitcher